Odell Glacier is a glacier draining northeast between Allan Hills and Coombs Hills into the upper Mawson Glacier in Oates Land. Named by the New Zealand Antarctic Place-Names Committee (NZ-APC) for Professor N.E. Odell, formerly of Otago University, New Zealand.

See also
 Airports in Antarctica

References

Glaciers of Oates Land